James Kemmy (14 September 1936 – 25 September 1997) was an Irish socialist politician from Limerick, who started his political career in the Labour Party. He later left Labour, was elected as an Independent Teachta Dála (TD), and founded the Democratic Socialist Party, which merged with the Labour Party in the 1990s.

Early and personal life
Kemmy was from the Garryowen area of the city. His father's death from tuberculosis meant that he had to leave school at 15 for a stonemason apprenticeship to support his four siblings. He worked for many years as bricklayer for Limerick City Council.

Political career
In 1963, Kemmy joined the Labour Party and worked as a trade unionist. He was a member of the party's National Administrative Council, and its Director of Elections in 1969. He resigned from the party in 1972 because of conflict with local Labour TD Stephen Coughlan. Taking advantage of a change in the law which removed the ban on council employees standing for election as councillors, he was elected to Limerick City Council in 1974. He had pledged not to wear the formal robes of a councillor, saying that "While some councillors act like clowns, there is no need to dress like them."

In 1975 Kemmy founded the Limerick Family Planning Clinic. At the time, it was illegal to sell condoms in Ireland and the clinic was condemned by the Catholic Church.

Kemmy stood unsuccessfully as an Independent candidate for Dáil Éireann in the Limerick East constituency at the 1977 general election. His second attempt, at the 1981 general election, was successful, and he was elected to the 22nd Dáil. During this time Kemmy criticised the 1981 Irish hunger strike which earned him the animosity of many Irish republicans and socialists as well as a number of his fellow trade unionists. Despite this he was re-elected at the February 1982 general election, but his opposition to the pro-life amendment to the Constitution had led to sustained attacks from the Catholic Church. At the November 1982 general election, Kemmy lost his seat to Labour's Frank Prendergast.

He returned to Dáil Éireann at the 1987 general election and was re-elected again at the 1989 general election. In May 1990, his Democratic Socialist Party merged with the Labour Party.

Kemmy was re-elected as a Labour Party TD at the 1992 general election and again at the 1997 general election. After the merger, Kemmy was elected vice-chairman of the Labour Party in 1991 and chairman in 1993. He was twice elected Mayor of Limerick, from 1991 to 1992 and again from 1995 to 1996.

Shortly before his death, Kemmy edited the acclaimed book The Limerick Anthology which featured the work of his admirer, Frank McCourt.

Kemmy was diagnosed with Multiple Myeloma in 1997. He died on 25 September 1997, following a short illness.  The by-election for his seat was held on 11 March 1998 and was won by the Labour Party candidate and former Democratic Socialist Party colleague Jan O'Sullivan.

The College of Business in the University of Limerick has been named in his memory in 2003 as the "Kemmy Business School". The University College Cork branch of the Labour Party is named after him. The city council had proposed in 1999 to name a new bridge after Kemmy, but it was renamed the Abbey Bridge. In 2000 the Limerick City Museum was renamed the Jim Kemmy Municipal Museum. The Jim Kemmy Papers are housed at the Glucksman Library, University of Limerick.

References

Further reading
 

1936 births
1997 deaths
Deaths from multiple myeloma
Labour Party (Ireland) TDs
Democratic Socialist Party (Ireland) TDs
Members of the 22nd Dáil
Members of the 23rd Dáil
Members of the 25th Dáil
Members of the 26th Dáil
Members of the 27th Dáil
Members of the 28th Dáil
Mayors of Limerick (city)
Local councillors in County Limerick
Independent TDs
Stonemasons